Business Centre Europe is a business news television programme that aired on CNBC Europe in 2001. It replaced Europe Tonight.  Airing from 18.00 UK time, Business Centre Europe was a 30-minute wrap-up of the day's top business stories in Europe and also crossed over to the US to update progress on the trading day there.  The show was initially presented by Sarah Clements and then by Emma Crosby.

The show took its name from CNBC United States' flagship evening show, Business Center.  However unlike its American and Asian counterparts which used slightly different lower-thirds on screen, the show's lower-thirds were the exactly same as the ones used on CNBC Europe's other daytime programmes.

The programme was canceled in late 2001 where Emma Crosby co-anchored the show preceding its timeslot, European Market Wrap along with Nigel Roberts.

See also
Business Center (U.S.)
Business Center (Asia)

CNBC Europe original programming
British television news shows
2001 British television series debuts
2001 British television series endings
Business-related television series in the United Kingdom